Karl Ingemar Svensson (21 March 1929 – 6 April 2004) was a Swedish rower. He competed at the 1952 Summer Olympics in the coxed pairs, together with Ove Nilsson and Lars-Erik Larsson, but failed to reach the final. His son Hans also became an Olympic rower.

References

1929 births
2004 deaths
People from Falkenberg
Swedish male rowers
Olympic rowers of Sweden
Rowers at the 1952 Summer Olympics
Sportspeople from Halland County